Metasia carnealis is a species of moth in the family Crambidae. It is found in France, Spain, Italy, Austria, Croatia, Bosnia and Herzegovina, Romania, Bulgaria, the Republic of North Macedonia, Albania, Greece and on Sardinia and Sicily, as well as in Turkey.

The wingspan is about 17-18 mm.

References

Moths described in 1829
Metasia
Moths of Europe
Moths of Asia